Synemon jcaria, the reddish-orange sun-moth, is a moth in the Castniidae family. It is found in Australia, including Victoria.

The wingspan is about 35 mm for males and 38 mm for females. Adults have brown forewings, each with two white spots. The hindwings are scarlet with brown markings.

Adults are on wing from late January to mid March.

The larvae feed on Lomandra effusa. They differ from the larvae of most other Synemon species in that they feed internally at the rhizomes of the food plant at ground level, rather than on the roots underground.

References

Moths described in 1874
Castniidae